The Maxberg Museum (aka Museum beim Solenhofer Aktien-Verein) was a German museum situated in Mörnsheim in the natural park of Altmühltal, near Solnhofen. It was founded by Alphons L. Zehntner in 1929. In 2004 was moved near to the town of Gunzenhausen, with the new name of Fossilien und Steindruck Museum (Fossils and Lithography Museum).

It has a large collection of fossils from the Solnhofen lithographic limestones, that once included a specimen of the early bird Archaeopteryx, the now missing Maxberg specimen.

References

Museums in Bavaria
Natural history museums in Germany